On the commercial transportation, mostly with airlines, the baggage allowance is the amount of checked baggage or hand/carry-on luggage the company will allow per passenger. There may be limits on the amount that is allowed free of charge, and hard limits on the amount that is allowed.

The limits vary per airline and depend on the class, elite status, type of ticket, flight origin and destination. If a flight is booked together with another flight it may also have different limits (e.g. if another flight on the same ticket is a long-haul flight). The exact baggage conditions are mentioned in the ticket information online.

Types of baggage
On aircraft, there are two types of baggage, which are treated differently: checked baggage and hand/carry-on luggage. For both types, transportation companies have rules on the weight and size.

For checked baggage, stored in the aircraft hold, usually the weight is the limiting factor. All checked items are generally weighed by the airline during check-in, and if they exceed the limit, the passenger is informed by the airline. To avoid any fees, the passenger often must switch some of the items found in the suitcase to another suitcase, or else carry it on.

Carry-on luggage is judged primarily by size. Bags are measured by dimension or in total linear measurement (length + width + height). However, there may also be other restrictions on the types of belongings that can be carried on the plane.

IATA
The International Air Transport Association (IATA) has released recommendations for limits on checked baggage and carry-on luggage. Some companies adhere to these recommendations, some adhere partially and some don't adhere at all to them.

The recommendations for checked baggage are: advised maximum weight 23 kg (50.71 lbs), weight limit 32 kg (70.55 lbs), advised maximum size 158 cm (62.2 in) length + width + height, limit 203 cm (nearly 80 in). The limit of 23 kg is present because of similar limits in health and safety regulations.

Because of the wide variation in hand/carry-on luggage limits, in 2015 IATA released a size recommendation for suitcases meant as hand/carry-on luggage. These state that suitcases should have a maximum size of 55 cm (21.65 in) long, 35 cm (13.78 in) wide and 20 cm (7.87 in) deep. If they meet these requirements, the bag may carry the logo "IATA cabin OK". This limit is tighter than most current airline limits, so bags with this logo are practically allowed everywhere.

Standard concepts
Two concepts for baggage weight limits are in use.

Piece Concept
The Piece Concept used to be applicable only for passengers travelling to or from the Americas. From the 1st August 2019, however, Vietnam Airlines (IATA Area 3)  adopted the Piece Concept. Under the Piece Concept, passengers are permitted to check in a certain number of suitcases with a per-bag weight of up to 23 kilograms for Economy Class, and up to 32 kilograms for Business or First Class. The allowed weight per suitcase and the number of suitcases varies per airline and depends on the class, elite status, type of ticket, flight origin and destination.

Weight Concept
Under the Weight Concept, each passenger is permitted to check in a total weight regardless of the number of suitcases. Often passengers traveling together can also combine their allowed weights. The total weight varies per airline and depends on the class, elite status, type of ticket, flight origin and destination.

Baggage pooling
During the departure in an airport, assembling all the associated baggage of passengers who are to be checked in together and checking those baggages in the name of one passenger is known as a pooling of the baggage.

Fees
Baggage fees in the United States have been the norm for many airlines and the trend is predicted to continue with many trans-Atlantic flights starting to collect fees for the lowest cost tickets. Typically, baggage fees are included in the ticket price. Different airlines websites will normally explicitly state their baggage fees policy and baggage limits. IdeaWorks, a travel consulting firm, predicted fees will become the norm by the end of 2019 and globally thereafter.

The 23 largest airlines in the United States reported earning $4.6 billion in baggage fees in 2017.

References

External links

 TSA List of Permitted and Prohibited Items

Civil aviation
Luggage